Curtis Edward Gowdy (July 31, 1919 – February 20, 2006) was an American sportscaster. He called Boston Red Sox games on radio and TV for 15 years, and then covered many nationally televised sporting events, primarily for NBC Sports and ABC Sports in the 1960s and 1970s. He coined the nickname "The Granddaddy of Them All" for the Rose Bowl Game, taking the moniker from the Cheyenne Frontier Days in his native Wyoming.

Early years
The son of Ruth and Edward "Jack" Gowdy (Curt's father was a manager and dispatcher for the Union Pacific railroad ), Curtis Edward (Curt) Gowdy was born in Green River, Wyoming, and moved to Cheyenne at age six.  As a high school basketball player in the 1930s, he led the state in scoring. He also showed an early interest in journalism, serving as sports editor of his high school newspaper.  He enrolled at the University of Wyoming in Laramie, where he was a 5'9" (175 cm) starter on the basketball team and played varsity tennis, lettering three years in both sports for the Cowboys.  He was also a member of the Alpha Tau Omega fraternity.

After graduating in 1942 with a degree in business statistics, he entered the army, where he was commissioned as a Second Lieutenant. Gowdy planned to become a fighter pilot, but a ruptured disk in his spine from a previous sports injury cut short his military service in the Army Air Force, leading to a medical discharge in 1943. Gowdy would continue to suffer from persistent back problems for many years.

In November 1943, recovering from back surgery, Gowdy made his broadcasting debut in Cheyenne calling a "six-man" high school football game from atop a wooden grocery crate in subzero weather, with about 15 people in attendance.  He found he had a knack for broadcasting, and worked at the small KFBC radio station and at the Wyoming Eagle newspaper as a sportswriter (and later sports editor).  After several years in Cheyenne, he accepted an offer from CBS's KOMA radio in Oklahoma City in September 1945.  He was hired primarily to broadcast Oklahoma college football (then coached by new-hire Bud Wilkinson) and Oklahoma State college basketball games (then coached by Hank Iba). In 1947–1948, in addition to calling football and basketball on KOMA, Gowdy was also broadcasting the baseball games of the Texas League Oklahoma City Indians, on station KOCY. When Gowdy announced in early 1949 that he was leaving Oklahoma to work in New York, his replacement was fellow Oklahoma City sportscaster Bob Murphy.

Gowdy's distinctive play-by-play style during his broadcasts of minor league baseball, college football, and college basketball in Oklahoma City earned him a national audition and then an opportunity with the New York Yankees in 1949, working with (and learning from) Mel Allen for two seasons.

Family background
In June 1949, Curt married Geraldine (Jerre) Dawkins. She had a bachelor's degree in Education from Central State College, and was studying for a master's degree in Radio Speech at the University of Oklahoma when they became engaged.  Curt and Jerre had three children: Cheryl Ann Gowdy, Curtis Edward Gowdy Jr. (who worked as a sports producer for ABC and SNY), and Trevor Gowdy.

Boston Red Sox
Gowdy began his Major League Baseball broadcasting career working as the No. 2 announcer to Mel Allen for New York Yankees games on radio and television in 1949–50. There, he succeeded Russ Hodges, who departed to become the New York Giants' lead announcer when the Yankees and Giants decided to broadcast a full slate of 154 games, instead of sharing the same radio network and announcers for the 77 home games of each team that had been broadcast (no away games of either team were broadcast). Two years later, in Boston, the Red Sox and the Boston Braves followed a similar path, with each team opting for its own networks and announcers to allow each team to broadcast their full schedules, home and away. Jim Britt, who had called home games of both teams, decided to stay with the Braves, opening the top spot on the Red Sox broadcast team.

In April 1951 at the age of 31, Gowdy began his tenure as the lead announcer for the Red Sox. For the next 15 years, he called the exploits of generally mediocre Red Sox teams on WHDH radio and on three Boston TV stations: WBZ-TV, WHDH-TV, and WNAC-TV (WBZ and WNAC split the Red Sox TV schedule from 1948 through 1955; WBZ alone carried the Red Sox from 1955 through 1957; and WHDH took over in 1958). During that time, Gowdy partnered with two future baseball broadcasting legends: Bob Murphy and Ned Martin. Chronic back pain caused Gowdy to miss the entire 1957 season. He also did nightly sports reports on WHDH radio when his schedule permitted. Gowdy was also the narrator of several Red Sox highlight films during his tenure in Boston which described the season in depth along with its key moments; this would lead to him eventually narrating World Series highlight films during his time with NBC (1968–1974, '77).

Gowdy called Ted Williams' final at-bat where he hit a home run into the bullpen in right-center field off Jack Fisher of Baltimore. He also called Tony Conigliaro's home run in his first at-bat at Fenway Park on April 17, 1964 at the age of 19.

He left WHDH after the 1965 season for NBC Sports, where for the next ten years he called the national baseball telecasts of the Saturday afternoon Game of the Week and Monday Night Baseball during the regular season (and the All-Star Game in July), and the postseason playoffs and World Series in October.

National broadcaster

Early ABC Sports career
Following a stint calling NBA games for NBC from 1955 to 1960, Gowdy moved to ABC, where he teamed with Paul Christman to cover college football in 1960 and 1961 and the American Football League from 1962 to 1964.

NBC Sports
In the fall of 1965, he moved full-time to NBC, with whom he would be employed for over a decade. Gowdy was the lead play-by-play announcer for the network for both the American Football League (AFC from 1970 on) and Major League Baseball, but Gowdy also covered a wide range of sports, earning him the nickname of the "broadcaster of everything." He called the 1969 Final Four in Louisville and during the closest played game of the tournament, the semi-final between UCLA and Drake, he confused Drake with Duke, mistakenly calling the Drake Bulldogs by the wrong name no less than three times. It was Drake that came within three points of upsetting the mighty Bruins. 

Besides Christman, who followed him from ABC to NBC, Gowdy's other football broadcast partners were Kyle Rote, Al DeRogatis, Don Meredith, John Brodie, and Merlin Olsen. His broadcast partners for baseball included Pee Wee Reese, Tony Kubek, Sandy Koufax, and Joe Garagiola. He also had many different partners for basketball, including Tommy Hawkins and Billy Packer. DeRogatis was also Gowdy's partner for college football games.

Departure from NBC's baseball telecasts
After the 1975 World Series, he was removed from NBC's baseball telecasts, when sponsor Chrysler insisted on having Joe Garagiola, who was their spokesman in many commercials, be the lead play-by-play voice. While Gowdy was on hand in the press box for Carlton Fisk's home run in Game 6 of the 1975 Series, the calls were made by two of Gowdy's Red Sox successors, Dick Stockton on TV and Ned Martin on radio. Gowdy was Martin's color man on that home run. Gowdy returned to the NBC World Series broadcast in 1978 as "Host" with Garagiola handling play-by-play and Kubek and Tom Seaver providing color. After umpire Frank Pulli decided not to call interference on a significant base-running play involving Reggie Jackson in Game 4 of the 1978 Series, Gowdy interviewed Pulli on NBC shortly before Game 5 began.

Later work
He continued as NBC's lead NFL announcer through the 1978 season, with his final broadcast being Super Bowl XIII between Pittsburgh and Dallas. With NBC anxious to promote Dick Enberg to the lead NFL position, NBC orchestrated a “trade” with CBS for the up-and-coming Don Criqui, who enjoyed a long career with NBC. After switching networks, Gowdy called NFL games on CBS for two seasons with former Kansas City Chiefs head coach Hank Stram, and also did baseball on radio. He returned to ABC to call regional college football in 1982 and 1983. In 1987, Gowdy was the radio voice of the New England Patriots.

In 1976, when Gowdy otherwise still worked for NBC, he was loaned to ABC to work on their Summer Olympics coverage in Montreal. Gowdy called swimming with Donna de Varona and basketball with Bill Russell.

Notable moments called by Gowdy
Curt Gowdy was present for some of American sports' storied moments, including Ted Williams' home run in his final at-bat in 1960, Super Bowl I, the AFL's "Heidi" game of 1968, and (after the 1968 pro football season) the third AFL-NFL World Championship game (Super Bowl III) in which Joe Namath and the New York Jets defeated the NFL champion Baltimore Colts. Two years later in Super Bowl V, Gowdy called the dramatic 16–13 Colts' win over Dallas. The next year in 1971, Gowdy's telecast on NBC caused many a Christmas dinner to be delayed as the country locked in that Christmas Day to the longest game in pro football history when the Miami Dolphins defeated the Kansas City Chiefs 27–24 in the final game at Kansas City's Municipal Stadium. He also covered Franco Harris' "Immaculate Reception" of 1972, Clarence Davis' miraculous catch in a "sea of hands" from Oakland Raiders quarterback Ken Stabler, to defeat the Miami Dolphins in the final seconds of a legendary 1974 AFC playoff game, and Hank Aaron's 715th home run in 1974.

Gowdy endeared himself to long-suffering American Football League fans when it was learned that in an off-air break towards the end of a game, he asked rhetorically: "I wonder if that (S.O.B.) Tex Maule is watching?", a reference to the Sports Illustrated writer who for years had denigrated the AFL. On-air, in contrast to some of his contemporary announcers of NFL games, he avoided their hyperbole and transparent adulation of players, and gave steady, nonpartisan, but colorful descriptions of AFL games. Gowdy was also known for the occasional malapropism, including a consoling comment just after the Red Sox lost the 1975 World Series: "Their future is ahead of them!"

Notable assignments
Over the course of a career that stretched into the 1980s, Gowdy covered pro football (both the AFL and NFL), Major League Baseball, college football, and college basketball. He was involved in the broadcast of 13 World Series, 16 baseball All-Star Games, 9 Super Bowls, 14 Rose Bowls, 8 Olympic Games and 24 NCAA Final Fours. He also hosted the long-running outdoors show The American Sportsman on ABC.

Gowdy called all the Olympic Games televised by ABC from 1964 to 1988 with Roone Arledge's sports department at ABC.

In the mid-1970s, Gowdy was host and producer of The Way It Was, for PBS, and in later years provided historic commentary for Inside the NFL, on HBO.

Relationship with Roone Arledge
Gowdy was also close friends with Arledge, and acknowledged that he gives Arledge all the credit for making ABC what it is today, including the creation of the network's sports department, and the innovations for televising sporting events that made the sports departments at NBC and CBS jealous. The two were the creators, and very first producers for the Wide World of Sports television show.

In 1970, he was coveted by ABC's Arledge for the new Monday Night Football, but Gowdy was bound by his contract to NBC Sports (although he continued with Grits Gresham of Natchitoches, Louisiana, to host The American Sportsman on ABC).

Commentating style
Gowdy was said to have a warm, slightly gravelly voice and an unforced, easy style that set him apart from his peers. (Author John Updike once described him as sounding "like everybody's brother-in-law.") Unlike many well-known sportscasters, Gowdy never developed catchphrases or signature calls, but merely described the action in a straightforward manner. Examples:

Retirement
Gowdy's career wound down after The American Sportsman was canceled in 1985.

He briefly came out of retirement in 1987 to call the New England Patriots on radio, and in 1988 he returned to NBC to call September NFL games with Merlin Olsen and old partner Al DeRogatis, while Olsen's regular partner Dick Enberg was covering the Summer Olympics in Seoul.

In May 2003, a few months shy of his 84th birthday, Gowdy called a Red Sox–Yankees game from Fenway Park, as part of the ESPN Major League Baseball "Living Legends" series. At the end of the broadcast, he thought he could have done better. ESPN's Chris Berman said, "We'll give you another chance." Gowdy replied, "Call me back."

Gowdy also co-hosted the Drum Corps International Championships on PBS from 1989 to 1993 with Steve Rondinaro.

Other appearances

Film cameos
Gowdy made cameo appearances in the movies The Naked Gun (1988) and Summer Catch (2001), and his voice can be heard in Heaven Can Wait (1978) and BASEketball (1998).

Heaven Can Wait (1978) – TV Commentator
The Naked Gun: From the Files of Police Squad! (1988) – The Baseball Announcer #5
An American Summer (1990) – Himself
BASEketball (1998) – World Series Announcer (voice)
Summer Catch (2001) – Himself

Television and radio commercials
In the 1950s and '60s, 'Curt Gowdy did pre-recorded and live commercials for Red Sox sponsor Narragansett Beer. His voice speaking the famous line: "Hi Neighbor, have a 'Gansett" was known to Red Sox fans everywhere.
In the 1980s, Gowdy voiced a series of beer commercials for Genesee. Essentially, these ads had an outdoor enthusiast theme, with Curt's tag line being "Genesee – the great outdoors in a glass."

Author
Gowdy, who also did some sportswriting during his early broadcasting days, wrote two books: Cowboy at the Mike (1966), with Al Hirshberg, and Seasons to Remember: The Way It Was in American Sports, 1945–1960 (1993), with John Powers. He also wrote the foreword for the 2000 book The Golden Boy, authored by Dr. George I. Martin, in which Gowdy described the subject of the book, Jackie Jensen, as possibly the best athlete he had ever covered.

Radio stations
In 1963, Gowdy purchased radio stations 800/WCCM and 93.7/WCCM-FM in Lawrence, Massachusetts, later changing the FM station's call letters to WCGY to somewhat match his name. Gowdy also owned several radio stations in Wyoming, including KOWB and KCGY in Laramie. He sold his broadcast interests in Massachusetts in 1994 and his Wyoming stations in 2002. He also owned 850/WEAT & WEAT-FM in West Palm Beach, Florida, and WBBX (AM) in New Hampshire. The year away from broadcasting the Red Sox in 1957 awakened him to the fact that he might need an alternate way of making a living, leading to his interest in station ownership.

Awards
In 1970, Gowdy became the first sportscaster to receive the George Foster Peabody Award. The National Sportscasters and Sportswriters Association named Gowdy as Massachusetts Sportscaster of the Year five times (1959–1963) and National Sportscaster of the Year twice (1966, 1969), and inducted him into its Hall of Fame in 1981. In 1985, he was inducted into the American Sportscasters Association Hall of Fame along with his onetime Yankees partner Mel Allen and Chicago legend Jack Brickhouse. He served as the organization's vice president and was a member of its board of directors. In addition, he was given the Ford C. Frick Award from the National Baseball Hall of Fame in 1984, the Pete Rozelle Award from the Pro Football Hall of Fame in 1993 and a lifetime achievement Emmy in 1992, and was selected to the Boston Red Sox Hall of Fame in 2000. Gowdy was president of the Naismith Memorial Basketball Hall of Fame for several years, and that institution's Curt Gowdy Media Award is presented annually to outstanding basketball writers and broadcasters; he was one of its first two recipients.

Curt Gowdy's 23 Halls of Fame honors/inductions: 
 Conservation Hall of Fame International – April 16, 1973
 Golden Plate Award of the American Academy of Achievement – 1973
 International Fishing Hall of Fame – 1981
 National Sportscasters & Sportswriters Association Hall of Fame – 1981
 Sportswriters & Broadcasters Hall of Fame – 1984
 Ford C. Frick Award recipient, awarded by the National Baseball Hall of Fame – 1984
 American Sportscasters Association Hall of Fame – 1985
 Naismith Memorial Basketball Hall of Fame – 1990, Curt Gowdy Media Award recipient
 Museum of Broadcasting Hall of Fame – 1990
 Gold Medal Hall of Fame Award from the National Academy of Television Arts and Sciences in New England
 Oklahoma Sports Hall of Fame – 1992
 Pro Football Hall of Fame – 1993, Pete Rozelle Radio-Television Award recipient
 Oklahoma Association of Broadcasters Hall of Fame – 1994
 American Football League Hall of Fame – 1995
 University of Wyoming Athletics Hall of Fame – September 25, 1998 
 Florida Sports Hall of Fame – 1999
 Boston Red Sox Hall of Fame – 2000
 Wyoming Sports Hall of Fame – 2001
 International Game Fish Association (IGFA) Fishing Hall of Fame – 2003
 Wyoming Association of Broadcasters Hall of Fame – 2003
 Wyoming Outdoor Hall of Fame – 2004
 National Freshwater Fishing Hall of Fame – 2005
 Rose Bowl Hall of Fame – 2005 inductee (January 3, 2006)

Curt Gowdy State Park
A state park in Wyoming, opened in 1971, was officially named for Gowdy on March 27, 1972, one of numerous honors bestowed on the native son from the state of Wyoming on "Curt Gowdy Day." The 11,000 acre (44 km2) Curt Gowdy State Park is halfway between his high school hometown of Cheyenne and his college town of Laramie. Additional land was acquired by the state for the park in 2006. "It has two beautiful lakes, hiking trails, camping, boating, fishing, and beauty," said Gowdy. "It has everything I love. What greater honor can a man receive?"

Gowdy was proud of his Wyoming heritage and loved the outdoors, and said that he was "born with a fly-rod in one hand," and that the sports microphone came a little later. In 2002, he recalled that his father, Edward Curtis Gowdy, who had taught him to hunt and fish, was the best fly-fisherman in the state. "We had free access to prime-time fishing and hunting. The outdoors was a way of life for me. I should have paid them to host The American Sportsman."

On July 31, 2013, on the 94th anniversary of his birth, the state park opened an interpretive center with exhibits about the history of the park and Gowdy's work to preserve area natural resources. Milward Simpson, director of the Wyoming State Parks and Cultural Resources Department, describes the 7,400-square foot building, which also includes meeting rooms and a lobby, as a monument to the "fantastic legacy" left by Gowdy.

Death
Gowdy died at the age of 86 at his winter home in Palm Beach, Florida, after an extended battle with leukemia. His funeral procession circled Fenway Park and he was interred in Mount Auburn Cemetery in Cambridge, Massachusetts. Pallbearers included his former NBC baseball analyst and New York Yankees shortstop Tony Kubek.

Curt Gowdy Post Office Building
On October 12, 2006, the United States Postal Service building in Green River, Wyoming, was officially designated as the "Curt Gowdy Post Office Building," honoring the place of Gowdy's birth. The legislation required for the USPS name change was introduced by Wyoming House Representative Barbara Cubin.

References

Further reading

External links
Curt Gowdy Ford C. Frick Award biography at the National Baseball Hall of Fame
American Football League Hall of Fame Curt Gowdy's citation
 

Ex-Red Sox Broadcaster Curt Gowdy Dies

Red Sox mourn the loss of Hall of Fame broadcaster Curt Gowdy – Boston Red Sox press release
Sports E-Cyclopedia's Memoriam to Curt 
Curt Gowdy dies at 86 The New York Times February 21, 2006
In memory of Curt Gowdy – U.S. Senator Craig Thomas February 27, 2006
Curt Gowdy State Park – 1972 west of Cheyenne, Wyoming
Curt Gowdy, Milo Hamilton and Vin Scully's Calls of Aaron's 715th Home Run from Archive.org

1919 births
2006 deaths
American Football League announcers
American men's basketball players
American radio sports announcers
American television sports announcers
Boston Celtics announcers
Boston Red Sox announcers
Burials at Mount Auburn Cemetery
College basketball announcers in the United States
College football announcers
Deaths from cancer in Florida
Deaths from leukemia
Ford C. Frick Award recipients
Major League Baseball broadcasters
Minor League Baseball broadcasters
National Basketball Association broadcasters
National Football League announcers
National Hockey League broadcasters
New England Patriots announcers
New York Knicks announcers
New York Yankees announcers
Oklahoma Sooners football announcers
Olympic Games broadcasters
Peabody Award winners
People from Green River, Wyoming
Pete Rozelle Radio-Television Award recipients
Poker commentators
Sportspeople from Cheyenne, Wyoming
United States Army Air Forces personnel of World War II
United States Army Air Forces soldiers
United States Football League announcers
University of Wyoming alumni
Writers from Wyoming
Wyoming Cowboys basketball players